Scourge of the Howling Horde is a generic setting adventure module for the 3.5 edition of the Dungeons & Dragons roleplaying game. The adventure is designed for 1st level characters. It contains a 32-page adventure.

Plot summary

Publication history
The book was published in 2006, and was written by Gwendolyn F.M. Kestrel, with cover art by Simone Bianchi and interior art by Carl Frank.

References

 Gwendolyn F.M. Kestrel. Scourge of the Howling Horde (Wizards of the Coast, 2006).

External links

Dungeons & Dragons modules
Role-playing game supplements introduced in 2006

ja:地底の城砦